Storsmeden is a mountain on the border of Dovre Municipality and Sel Municipality in Innlandet county, Norway. The mountain is part of a group of mountains called Smiubelgen. It is surrounded by several other notable mountains including Digerronden, Veslesmeden, and Høgronden to the northeast, Rondeslottet to the east, Ljosåbelgen and Bråkdalsbelgen to the south, Sagtindan and Trolltinden to the west; Gråhøe and Vassberget to the northwest; and Stygghøin to the north.

The mountain is easiest to access on its western ridge. Experienced hikers may access it via Veslesmeden by scrambling the eastern ridge.

Name
The meaning of the name is "the big blacksmith".

See also
List of mountains of Norway

References

Dovre
Sel
Mountains of Innlandet